The Peoria Rivermen were a professional ice hockey team in the ECHL. They played in Peoria, Illinois, United States, at the Carver Arena. The team replaced a team of the same name that had played in the higher budget International Hockey League since 1984 after several seasons of financial losses. In 2005, ownership obtained a franchise in the American Hockey League.

History

Season-by-season results

Team records
Goals: 42 Tyler Rennette (2002–03) 
Assists: 74 Jean-Guy Trudel (1997–98)
Points: 113 Jean-Guy Trudel (1997–98)
Penalty minutes: 318 Ken Boone (1998–99) 
GAA (min. 20 games): 1.91 Curtis Sanford (2000–01) 
SV%: (min. 20 games): .929 Alfie Michaud (2004–05)
Career goals: 119 Tyler Rennette
Career assists: 163 Joe Rybar
Career points: 243 Joe Rybar
Career penalty minutes: 986 Trevor Baker
Career goaltending wins: 47 Alfie Michaud
Career shutouts: 7 Alfie Michaud
Career games: 341 Dan Hodge

References

External links
The Internet Hockey Database - Peoria Rivermen

Peoria Rivermen
Defunct ice hockey teams in Illinois
Ice hockey clubs established in 1996
Sports clubs disestablished in 2005
Ice hockey teams in Illinois